David McKay (born 5 November 1949) is a former Australian rules footballer who played for the Carlton Blues during the 1970s.

In 1970, in just his second season of VFL football McKay won a premiership with Carlton and was voted as best on ground in the grand final. Originally from Newlyn, he was also part of winning grand finals in 1972,79 and 1981. The latter was his final game of VFL football and he retired with 263 games and 277 goals for the club.

External links

1949 births
Australian rules footballers from Victoria (Australia)
Carlton Football Club players
Carlton Football Club Premiership players
Living people
Four-time VFL/AFL Premiership players